The genus Incisalia, described by Samuel Hubbard Scudder in 1872,  consists of butterflies in the family Lycaenidae found in North America. They are commonly called elfins.

Species
Listed alphabetically:
 Incisalia augustinus (Westwood, 1852) – brown elfin
 Incisalia eryphon (Boisduval, 1852) – western pine elfin
 Incisalia fotis (Strecker, [1878]) – early elfin
 Incisalia henrici (Grote & Robinson, 1867) – Henry's elfin
 Incisalia irus (Godart, [1824]) – frosted elfin
 Incisalia lanoraieensis Sheppard, 1934 – bog elfin
 Incisalia mossii (H. Edwards, 1881) – Moss's elfin, stonecrop elfin, Schryver's elfin
 Incisalia niphon (Hübner, [1819]) – eastern pine elfin
 Incisalia polios Cook & Watson, 1907 – hoary elfin

References

Callophrys
Butterflies of North America
Lycaenidae genera